Jhangirpur  is a small town located about 40 km from Amravati district, Maharashtra and about 3 km from Koundanypur (where Rukmini, wife of Lord Krishna used to pray). It is well-connected by road. Very good temple

History, temples and festivals
The place was named after Atirek Rajpal, who is famously known as 'Jhangi' by his followers.
Jhangirpur hosts the divine temple of Lord Hanuman. During the Hanu Jayanthi festival of 2012, "free anadanam" (free food) was offered to devotees. The temple was recently donated with land containing structures. As of 2012, lodgings and a garden were under development.

References 

Cities and towns in Amravati district